Cope is a town in Orangeburg County, South Carolina, United States. The population was 77 at the 2010 census, a decline from 107 in 2000.

History
Cope Depot was added to the National Register of Historic Places in 2001.

Geography
Cope is located at  (33.3775, -81.0077).

Demographics

As of the census of 2010, there were 77 people, 13 households, and 12 families residing in the town. The population density was 431.7 people per square mile (165.3/km2). There were 46 housing units at an average density of 185.6 per square mile (71.0/km2). The racial makeup of the town was 41.12% White and 58.88% African American. Hispanic or Latino of any race were 2.80% of the population.

There were 38 households, out of which 36.8% had children under the age of 18 living with them, 39.5% were married couples living together, 26.3% had a female householder with no husband present, and 26.3% were non-families. 21.1% of all households were made up of individuals, and 2.6% had someone living alone who was 65 years of age or older. The average household size was 2.82 and the average family size was 3.29.

In the town, the population was spread out, with 32.7% under the age of 18, 3.7% from 18 to 24, 31.8% from 25 to 44, 20.6% from 45 to 64, and 11.2% who were 65 years of age or older. The median age was 35 years. For every 100 females, there were 87.7 males. For every 100 females age 18 and over, there were 80.0 males.

The median income for a household in the town was $28,056, and the median income for a family was $28,125. Males had a median income of $25,625 versus $30,417 for females. The per capita income for the town was $18,243. There were 20.0% of families and 24.4% of the population living below the poverty line, including 36.2% of under eighteen and 21.4% of those over 64.

Historical sites
 Cope Depot

References

External links
Government Information on Town of Cope

Towns in Orangeburg County, South Carolina
Towns in South Carolina